"Loco" is a song co-written and recorded by American country music artist David Lee Murphy. It was released in January 2004 as the first single from Murphy's album, Tryin' to Get There. The song reached number 5 on the Billboard Hot Country Singles & Tracks chart in July 2004. It was also Murphy's first  entry on the Billboard Hot 100, peaking at number 44.  The song was written by Murphy and Kim Tribble.

Critical reception
Deborah Evans Price, of Billboard magazine reviewed the song favorably, calling it a "frisky, uptempo number about the joys about being a little bit crazy." She goes on to say that "saucy fiddle and infectious lead-guitar work add spice to this fun tune." She praises Murphy, stating that he remains an "engaging vocalist who knows how to put just the right touch on a light-hearted lyric."

Chart performance
"Loco" debuted at number 59 on the U.S. Billboard Hot Country Singles & Tracks for the week of January 17, 2004.

Year-end charts

References

2004 singles
David Lee Murphy songs
Songs written by David Lee Murphy
Songs written by Kim Tribble
2004 songs